The Power Pad (known in Japan as Family Trainer, and in Europe and briefly in the United States as Family Fun Fitness) is a floor mat game controller for the Nintendo Entertainment System. It is a gray mat with twelve pressure-sensors embedded between two layers of flexible plastic. It was originally developed by Bandai.

Bandai first released the accessory in 1986 as the Family Trainer pack for the Famicom in Japan, and later released in the United States. Nintendo released it in 1988 as the Power Pad, along with the game World Class Track Meet, which was a rebranding of an earlier game.

Overview
In 1988, Nintendo acquired the rights from Bandai for the accessory in North America and renamed it the Power Pad, with the remaining Family Fun Fitness mats recalled from stores. Bandai retained the rights to the product outside of North America. The Power Pad sold 500,000 units in North America.

The Power Pad accessory is laid out in front of the video display for various games, generally plugged into the second NES controller port, with players stepping on the large buttons to control gameplay. There are two illustrated sides to the pad: Side A, which is rarely used, has eight buttons, while side B has twelve buttons numbered 1-12.

Games using the Power Pad often test players on their timing and coordination, memory, "running" speed, or allow them to play music with their steps. Games such as Dance Dance Revolution can trace the lineage of their control mechanisms back to the Power Pad (see dance pad).

Revival
In 2007, Namco Bandai Games announced that the Power Pad would see a reappearance for the original Wii. This version of the pad, called the Mat Controller, will also work in conjunction with the Wii Remote, and connects physically to the Wii console via its built-in GameCube controller ports. For later Wii models, it is incompatible as they drop the GameCube ports. It was released along with Active Life: Outdoor Challenge in North America  (known as Family Trainer Athletic World in Japan and Family Trainer in Europe) in 2008. Its sequel Active Life: Extreme Challenge was released in 2009.

Compatible games
The following is a list of all 11 video games which were created for use with the accessory. The games were developed by Human Entertainment except for the last three entries in the series. All but one of them were published by Bandai, though some were localized in North America by Nintendo.

See also
 Dance pad
 List of Nintendo Entertainment System accessories

References

External links 
Technical information
Wii Family Trainer Release
Short Order & Eggsplode at NinDB

1986 video games
1987 video games
1988 video games
1989 video games
1990 video games
Bandai games
Nintendo franchises
Dance pads
Fitness games
Nintendo Entertainment System accessories
Nintendo Entertainment System games
Athletics video games